
Gmina Gromnik is a rural gmina (administrative district) in Tarnów County, Lesser Poland Voivodeship, in southern Poland.

The gmina contains part of the protected area called Ciężkowice-Rożnów Landscape Park.

Villages
Gmina Gromnik contains the villages and settlements of Brzozowa, Chojnik, Golanka, Gromnik, Polichty, Rzepiennik Marciszewski and Siemiechów.

Neighbouring gminas
Gmina Gromnik is bordered by the gminas of Ciężkowice, Pleśna, Rzepiennik Strzyżewski, Tuchów and Zakliczyn.

References
Polish official population figures 2006

Gromnik
Tarnów County